The 2010–11 Mid-American Conference men's basketball season began with practices in October 2010, followed by the start of the 2010–11 NCAA Division I men's basketball season in November. Conference play began in January 2011 and concluded in March 2011. Kent State won the regular season title with a conference record of 12–4. Sixth-seeded Akron defeated Kent State in the MAC tournament final in overtime and represented the MAC in the NCAA tournament where they lost in the first round to Notre Dame.

Preseason awards
The preseason poll and league awards were announced by the league office on October 28, 2010.

Preseason men's basketball poll
(First place votes in parenthesis)

East Division
 Ohio 128 (12)
 Kent State 114 (8)
 Akron 104 (4)
 Miami 84
  42
 Buffalo 32

West Division
  124 (12)
  122 (8)
 Eastern Michigan 88 (2)
 Western Michigan 68
 Northern Illinois 64 (2)
  38 points

Tournament champs
Ohio (10), Kent State (6), Central Michigan (4), Ball State (2), Akron (2)

Honors

Postseason

Mid–American tournament

NCAA tournament

Postseason awards

Coach of the Year: Geno Ford, Kent State
Player of the Year: Justin Greene, Kent State
Freshman of the Year: Javon McCrea, Buffalo
Defensive Player of the Year:  Michael Porrini, Kent State
Sixth Man of the Year: Carlton Guyton, Kent State

Honors

See also
2010–11 Mid-American Conference women's basketball season

References